Giljeva (Serbian Cyrillic: Гиљева) is a mountain in southwestern Serbia, on the western edge of Pešter plateau, near the town of Sjenica.

References

Mountains of Serbia